Emraclidine (developmental code name CVL-231) is an investigational antipsychotic for the treatment of both schizophrenia and Alzheimer’s disease psychosis developed by Cerevel Therapeutics. As of February 2023, it is in phase II of clinical trial. Emraclidine is a positive allosteric modulator that selectively targets the muscarinic acetylcholine receptor M4 subtype. The M4 receptor subtype is expressed in the striatum of the brain, which plays a key role in regulating acetylcholine and dopamine levels. An imbalance of these neurotransmitters has been linked to psychotic symptoms in schizophrenia. Unlike other muscarinic receptors, M4 receptor subtypes are selectively expressed in the striatum and activation of these receptors has been shown to indirectly regulate dopamine levels without blocking D2/D3 receptors, which may lead to unwanted motor side effects seen in current antipsychotics.

References 

Antipsychotics
Pyrrolopyridines
Carboxamides
Pyridines
Azetidines
Trifluoromethyl compounds